La Hondonada is a sector in the city of Santo Domingo of the Distrito Nacional in the Dominican Republic. This neighborhood is populated in particular by individuals from the lower class.

Sources 
Distrito Nacional sectors

Populated places in Santo Domingo